Mesolia rectilineella is a moth in the family Crambidae. It was described by George Hampson in 1899. It is found in the Punjab region of what was British India.

References

Ancylolomiini
Moths described in 1899